Patrick County is a county located on the central southern border of the Commonwealth of Virginia. As of the 2020 census, the population was 17,608. Its county seat is Stuart. It is located within both the rolling hills and valleys of the Piedmont Region and the more mountainous Southwest Virginia.

History
Patrick County was formed in 1791, when Patrick Henry County was divided into Patrick County and Henry County. Patrick Henry County was named for Patrick Henry, and was formed in 1777.

Prior to the formation of Patrick County, one of the Virginia colony's first frontier forts lay within the boundaries of what was then Halifax County on the banks of the North Mayo River. The location of Fort Mayo, now marked by a Virginia state historic marker, lies within present-day Patrick County. One of a number of such forts built by Virginia colonists from the Potomac River south to North Carolina, it was commanded by Captain Samuel Harris in 1756, the year in which George Washington made a tour of Fort Mayo and several other forts on the Virginia frontier. Fort Mayo was the southernmost of the Virginia frontier forts and saw action during the French and Indian War (1754-1763) between the English and French and associated Native American allies.

One of Patrick County's most prominent early settlers was Col. Abraham Penn (sometimes written Abram Penn), born in 1743 in what is today Amherst County, Virginia. Penn qualified as Lieutenant in the Amherst County militia in June 1768, and led a company under Col. Andrew Lewis at the Battle of Point Pleasant in 1774. Penn later moved with his wife Ruth (née Stovall) to present-day Henry County, Virginia, where he patented lands at the later site of Beaver Creek Plantation. Penn served on the Committee of Safety for both Henry and Pittsylvania counties, and as a delegate to the Virginia General Assembly from Henry County.

Eventually selling those lands to the Hairston family, Penn moved with his family a few miles farther west to what is today Patrick County, where he built his plantation home Poplar Grove. During the American Revolution, Col. Penn ordered the muster of some 300 militiamen under his command to march south to aid General Nathanael Greene at the battle of Guilford Court House. Historians question whether the troops arrived in time for the fighting.

It is documented that Penn commanded militia in the Battle of Eutaw Springs. Penn was later present at Yorktown to witness the surrender of the British forces under General Cornwallis.

Col. Penn was one of the organizers of Patrick County, which he served many years as a justice. The unincorporated community of Penn's Store is named for Col. Penn and his descendants. The Abram Penn Highway in Patrick County is named for Col. Penn, who died in 1801.

On October 24, 2004, a private corporate plane crashed on Bull Mountain, killing all eight passengers and two crew, including Busch Series racer Ricky Hendrick and Hendrick Motorsports lead engine builder Randy Dorton.

Geography

Patrick County has two defined physiographic provinces lying within its boundaries. One-third of Patrick County is in the rolling Piedmont region, and the remaining two-thirds are in the picturesque Blue Ridge Mountains, where the Blue Ridge Parkway forms the county's western border with Carroll and Floyd counties to the north.

Adjacent counties
 Carroll County, Virginia - west
 Floyd County, Virginia - northwest
 Franklin County, Virginia - northeast
 Henry County, Virginia - east
 Stokes County, North Carolina - south
 Surry County, North Carolina - southwest

National protected areas
 Blue Ridge Parkway (part) including Rocky Knob Recreation Area (part)

Major highways
 
 Blue Ridge Parkway

Demographics

2020 census

Note: the US Census treats Hispanic/Latino as an ethnic category. This table excludes Latinos from the racial categories and assigns them to a separate category. Hispanics/Latinos can be of any race.

2010 Census
As of the 2010 census, there were 18,490 people, 8,081 households, and 5,410 families residing in the county.  The population density was 40 people per square mile (16/km2).  There were 10,083 housing units at an average density of 20 per square mile (8/km2).  The racial makeup of the county was 91.10% White, 5.9% Black or African American, 0.30% Native American, 0.20% Asian, 0.00% Pacific Islander, 1.40% from other races, and 1.10% from two or more races.  2.40% of the population were Hispanic or Latino of any race.

As of the 2000 Census, there were 8,141 households, out of which 28.50% had children under the age of 18 living with them, 58.90% were married couples living together, 8.60% had a female householder with no husband present, and 28.60% were non-families. 25.80% of all households were made up of individuals, and 11.40% had someone living alone who was 65 years of age or older.  The average household size was 2.36 and the average family size was 2.81.

In the county, the population was spread out, with 21.70% under the age of 18, 7.10% from 18 to 24, 28.00% from 25 to 44, 26.70% from 45 to 64, and 16.50% who were 65 years of age or older.  The median age was 40 years. For every 100 females there were 96.90 males.  For every 100 females age 18 and over, there were 94.90 males.

The median income for a household in the county was $28,705, and the median income for a family was $36,232. Males had a median income of $25,391 versus $18,711 for females. The per capita income for the county was $15,574.  About 9.60% of families and 13.40% of the population were below the poverty line, including 15.40% of those under age 18 and 18.00% of those age 65 or over.

Distinctions
Part of the Rocky Knob American Viticultural Area, as defined by the federal government, is located in Patrick County.  Patrick County was also a setting for the ministry of Reverend Bob Childress whose life was chronicled in the book "The Man Who Moved a Mountain".

Tourism
Patrick County is one of the great tourist areas of Virginia. The county has one of Virginia's seven remaining covered bridges (Bob White covered bridge washed away in September 2015), rises from 900 feet to well over 3,000 feet, providing panoramic views. Patrick County is Virginia's Gateway to the Blue Ridge Parkway, and is only minutes from Mabry Mill, the most photographed destination on the parkway. It is also the home of Fairy Stone State Park.The county hosts the longest running beach music festival on the East coast, is home to the legendary NASCAR team the Wood Brothers, and many more attractions each year provide a wide range of activities for every group of every age.

Patrick County is featured on the Virginia is For Lovers website.

The Bob White Covered Bridge once located in Woolwine washed away by Flood Waters in September, 2015. Bob White Covered Bridge Washes Away

Education
Patrick County Public Schools has seven total public schools, of which four are for grades K-7, one is for grades K-3, one is for grades 4–7, and Patrick County High School is for grade 8-12.  One school, Stuart Elementary was recognized in 2008 as receiving the Governor's VIP award.  Recently two schools, Stuart Elementary and Woolwine Elementary were designated as Distinguished Title I schools.  In 2006, Patrick County Public Schools was listed as an outperforming school district, one of 12 in the state of Virginia, by Standard and Poor's.  All of the schools have received "full accreditation" status by the State of Virginia and all schools have met Adequate Yearly Progress (AYP) status as defined by the No Child Left Behind Act of 2001.

Communities

Town
 Stuart

Census-designated place
 Patrick Springs

Other unincorporated communities

 Ararat
 Claudville
 Critz
 Fairystone
 Mayberry – See Mayberry#The name "Mayberry".
 Meadows of Dan
 Penns Store
 Russell Creek
 Vesta
 Woolwine

Notable residents
 Confederate cavalry commander Maj. Gen. J.E.B. Stuart was born at the Laurel Hill Farm in Patrick County on February 6, 1833.
 Rev. Bob Childress, Presbyterian minister whose life is chronicled in "The Man Who Moved a Mountain," whose unfinished autobiography and the biographies of his children are preserved in "Childress Cousins from the Hills and Hollows of Southern Virginia," and whose legacy includes six rock churches in Patrick, Carroll, and Floyd Counties.
 Herb Hash was a Major League Baseball player for the Boston Red Sox in the late 1930s and early 1940s.  Hash has been inducted into the University of Richmond Baseball of Fame.  He was born in Woolwine.
 Gerald L. Baliles served as Governor of Virginia from 1986 through 1990.
 Mary Sue Terry served as Attorney General of Virginia from 1986 until 1993, the first female Attorney General in Virginia history.
 Robert Lee Tudor, a member of the New York State Assembly from 1913 to 1917, was born in Critz in 1874. 
 Martin Clark, author and Virginia Circuit Court judge.
 Brad Clontz was a Major League Baseball relief pitcher for the Atlanta Braves, Los Angeles Dodgers, New York Mets, and the Pittsburgh Pirates.
 Wood Brothers Racing, the NASCAR Racing Team.
 Tim Goad, former American Football League Defensive Tackle for the New England Patriots, Cleveland Browns, and Baltimore Ravens.
 Richard Joshua Reynolds, founder of R.J. Reynolds Tobacco Co., was born at Rock Spring Plantation, near present-day Critz, Va. on July 20, 1850.
 J.J. Webster, served as County Commissioner for Rockingham County, North Carolina, was born in Patrick County in 1898.

Government
Patrick County is governed by an elected five-member Board of Supervisors. Management of the County is vested in a Board-appointed County Administrator.

There are also five elected Constitutional Officers:
 Clerk of the Circuit Court: Sherri Hazlewood
 Commonwealth's Attorney: Stephanie Vipperman
 Sheriff: Dan Smith
 Commissioner of Revenue: Janet Rorrer
 Treasurer: Sandra Stone

See also
 National Register of Historic Places listings in Patrick County, Virginia

References

External links
 Official site
 Patrick County Public Schools site
 Patrick County Chamber of Commerce

 
Virginia counties
1791 establishments in Virginia
Counties of Appalachia